The Pyke River is a river in the south west of New Zealand's South Island. It flows generally south into Lake Wilmot then Lake Alabaster, before becoming a tributary of the Hollyford River.

See also
List of rivers of New Zealand

References

Rivers of Fiordland